Alpha Chi Omega (also known as Alpha Chi or A Chi O) is a national women's fraternity founded on October 15, 1885.

As of 2018, there are 132 collegiate and 279 alumnae chapters represented across the United States, and the fraternity counts more than 230,000 members initiated through its history.

Alpha Chi Omega is a member of the National Panhellenic Conference, the governing council of 26 women's fraternities.

History 

Alpha Chi Omega was formed at DePauw University in Greencastle, Indiana on October 15, 1885.

In the fall of 1885, Professor James Hamilton Howe, the first Dean of the Music School, invited seven young women from the school to a meeting with the purpose of forming a fraternity. Those young women were Anna Allen Smith, Olive Burnett Clark, Bertha Deniston Cunningham, Amy DuBois Rieth, Nellie Gamble Childe, Bessie Grooms Keenan, and Estelle Leonard. Howe collaborated with James G. Campbell, a Beta Theta Pi, to form a national fraternity. Campbell laid out the first constitution and by-laws.  This first constitution read: "The object of this fraternity is as follows: To attain the highest musical culture and to cultivate those principles that embody true womanhood."  On February 26, 1886, the fraternity was given its formal introduction by a soiree musical.

Alpha Chi Omega joined the National Panhellenic Conference in 1903.

Early musical requirements 
Association with the music school was required early on, as the fraternity only allowed School of Music students. Later on, this was changed and the minimum requirement became registration in one music course of any kind. Members then graduated in many other departments of the university, including the liberal arts department. In 1889, a national literary fraternity offered to merge with Alpha Chi Omega; however, unlike professional fraternities, Alpha Chi never considered taking members of other fraternities. In its early years it was externally considered to be a professional music society, but due to disagreement with this designation, in 1900, the sorority added literary qualifications, which led to it being considered a general (social) sorority by 1905.

Beginnings of philanthropy 
In 1911, Alpha Chi Omega began supporting the MacDowell Colony, as Marian MacDowell was an alumna of Alpha Chi Omega. During World War I and II Alpha Chi Omega offered its support by helping working mothers who were married to service men by providing day nurseries and helping orphaned French children. In 1947, Alpha Chi Omega adopted Easter Seals as its philanthropy and supported other projects associated with cerebral palsy.

In 1978, the fraternity created the Alpha Chi Omega Foundation to merge funds for the fraternity's philanthropic projects and educational programming into one nonprofit organization. In 1992, the fraternity voted adopt a new primary philanthropy of supporting victims of domestic violence. Alpha Chi Omega was the first major organization to speak out and adopt Domestic Violence Awareness as their philanthropy. Alpha Chi Omega continues to support Easter Seals.

Symbols 

Alpha Chi Omega's Founders chose "Alpha" (Α), the first letter of the Greek alphabet, because they were forming the first fraternity in the school of music. Since they thought they might also be founding the last such fraternity, "Omega" (Ω) seemed appropriate, considering it stands for the end. "Kai", meaning "and", was added to form "the beginning and the end". "Kai" was soon changed to "Chi" (Χ), a letter of the Greek alphabet.

Alpha Chi Omega's colors of scarlet red and olive green were chosen to commemorate the fraternity's fall founding. The fraternity's official symbol is a three-stringed lyre and the official flower is a red carnation, which exemplifies the fraternity's colors. There is no official stone. The badge (pin) worn by initiated members is in the shape of a lyre, typically featuring pearls and the fraternity's Greek letters on the crossbar. Alpha Chi Omega chose the lyre to be their official symbol since it was the first instrument played by the Gods on Mount Olympus. Although Alpha Chi Omega no longer is strictly a musical sorority, they are still connected to their musical heritage through their symbol of the lyre.

The new member badge (pin) worn by uninitiated members is a lozenge emblazoned with the symbol of a lyre and the sorority's colors of scarlet red on the upper half of the badge and olive green on the lower half of the badge.

Philanthropy 
The fraternity manages its philanthropy through its nonprofit arm, the Alpha Chi Omega Foundation. This branch continues to grant funds to the fraternity's former partners, the MacDowell Colony and Easter Seals, as well as to services and programs for domestic violence victims and on education on the subject. The Foundation also helps to support members and those closely related to Alpha Chi Omegas through other funds and grants to ensure continuous support for its members.

Individual chapters focus their attention on increasing the awareness of domestic violence, its effects on individuals, families, and children, as well as actively aiding victims of domestic violence through hands-on activities and service projects. Domestic violence includes any behaviors that "intimidate, manipulate, humiliate, isolate, frighten, terrorize, coerce, threaten, blame, hurt, injure, or wound someone" in order to influence another person in a domestic relationship. This work is done through local agencies, which undergraduate and alumnae chapters support physically and financially. Local agencies include rape crisis centers, emergency shelters and safe houses for victims of domestic violence and their children, and long-term assistance centers for battered women across the nation. We work to prevent domestic violence, raise awareness about its severity, educate others on how to recognize and address it, and support organizations that assist survivors of domestic violence and their children.

As of 2018 Alpha Chi Omega is partnered with Mary Kay, Allstate Foundation Purple Purse, The One Love Foundation, RAINN, and It's On Us, various organizations which also support domestic/sexual violence awareness and education and survivor support. The fraternity also supports Kristin's Story in cooperation with Delta Delta Delta, a nonprofit set up by the Delta Delta Delta mother of an Alpha Chi Omega member who committed suicide following a sexual assault.

Chapters

Membership 
There are 194 chapters of Alpha Chi Omega at colleges and universities in the United States. There are also 279 alumnae chapters, which allow women of all post-graduate ages to come together and continue the mission and values of Alpha Chi Omega. Members from the collegiate and alumnae chapters total to over 300,000 sisters since the fraternity was founded in 1885. Collegiate chapters work directly with alumnae chapters to link sisters from around the country. In addition, alumnae chapters continue the cause of working to eliminate domestic violence. The fraternity states its membership values as "academic interest, character, financial responsibility, leadership, and personal development." The fraternity's national vision is to shape the future "through the powerful, transformative and everlasting connections of real, strong women.

Traditions 
Members of Alpha Chi Omega have several national programs for important dates:

Founders' Day — Sisters gather on October 15 of each year to recognize the fraternity's fall founding at DePauw University in Greencastle, Indiana. Members wear their badges, along with scarlet and olive green ribbons.
MacDowell Month — Every February, Alpha Chi Omega women celebrate the fine arts and their fine-arts heritage. Most collegiate chapters encourage their members to attend and perform in fine art events during this month. "Named for the MacDowell artists' colony in New Hampshire (Alpha Chi Omega's first philanthropic p
Local Founding Days — Each collegiate chapter recognizes its founding anniversary annually.
The National Convention — Members join together every two years to conduct fraternity business, reunite with sisters, and celebrate the fraternity.
Hera Day- Sisters honor the fraternity's patron goddess Hera by dedicating themselves on March 1 of each year to aid the happiness and overall well-being of others through volunteering and fundraising for domestic violence shelters in their communities.

Notable alumnae

Arts and entertainment

Fannie Bloomfield Zeisler (Alpha): Austrian-born U.S. pianist
 Maud Powell (Alpha): American violinist
Eleanor Coppola (Alpha Psi): Emmy award–winning documentarian
Maddy Curley (Epsilon Chi): actress, former gymnast
Melissa d'Arabian (Alpha Iota): The Next Food Network Star winner and host of Ten Dollar Dinners
Carol Duvall (Beta Epsilon): host of The Carol Duvall Show
Alyson Hannigan (Theta Xi): actress ("Buffy the Vampire Slayer", "How I Met Your Mother")
Jenilee Harrison (Epsilon): actress (Dallas, Three's Company)
Nancy Hoyt (Delta Kappa): participant in "The Amazing Race" during the first season and teamed with her daughter, Emily Hoyt
Janet Hsieh (Theta Omicron): Television host, Golden Bell Award winner, model, violinist
Laura Innes (Gamma): actress (ER) 
Sarah Jones (Epsilon Kappa): contestant on season 4 of Survivor
Tami Lane (Zeta Eta): make-up artist and Academy Award winner
Audra Levi aka Audra Lee (Alpha Psi initiate/Epsilon affiliate): star of Kid's Beat on TBS in the 1980s, co-founder of the SoCal VoCals
Beth Mitchell (Zeta Xi): dancer, 1998 National Shag Dancing Champion
Meredith Monroe (Upsilon): actress (Dawson's Creek)
Agnes Nixon (Gamma): four-time Daytime Emmy–winning TV writer and producer
Aubrey O'Day (Epsilon Psi): singer (former member of Danity Kane, MTV's Making The Band 3)
Martha Quinn: Original MTV VJ, Radio host, actress
Atoosa Rubenstein (Theta Psi): Magazine editor
Melissa Rycroft (Psi): former Dallas Cowboys Cheerleader and reality show star on The Bachelor and Dancing with the Stars.
Sarah Shahi (Iota Sigma): actress (The L Word)
Gail Sheehy (Alpha Iota): author
Trista Sutter (Alpha Mu): star of The Bachelorette
Dawn Wells (Rho): actress (Gilligan's Island)

Beauty pageant contestants

 Betsy Bobel (Gamma Mu): 2000 Miss Indiana winner
 Hannah Brown (Alpha Upsilon): 2018 Miss Alabama USA winner and star of The Bachelorette
 Jen Corey (Beta Rho): 2009 Miss District of Columbia winner, top 10 Miss America 2010 contestant
 Deidre Downs (Zeta Lambda): 2005 Miss America winner
 Jane Anne Jayroe (Gamma Tau): 1967 Miss America; Oklahoma government official
Simone Esters (Alpha Nu): 2019 Miss Missouri; 2nd runner up Miss America
Taylor Kessler (Delta Kappa): Miss Texas USA 2020

News and journalism

 Rita Braver (Kappa): CBS News correspondent
 Linda Cavanaugh Clark (Psi): News anchor/journalist
 Shannon Fisher (Beta Delta): journalist
 Georgie Anne Geyer (Gamma): journalist and author
 Natalie Jacobson (Alpha Tau): News anchor/journalist
 Kristen Soltis Anderson (Gamma Iota): Pollster/Writer/TV Personality
 Ronda Carman (Delta Kappa) Author/Public Figure

Politics

Jari Askins (Psi): Lieutenant Governor of Oklahoma, lawyer
Stephanie Bice (Gamma Epsilon): U.S. Representative for 
Condoleezza Rice (Gamma Delta): Former U.S. Secretary of State
Victoria Toensing (Alpha Mu): former deputy assistant Attorney General in the U.S. Justice Department
Sherron Watkins (Alpha Phi): Enron whistleblower, USA Today and Time Person(s) of the Year 2002

Science, technology and engineering

Wally Funk (Gamma Epsilon): First female FAA and NTSB inspector; one of the Mercury 13; oldest woman in space as of July 2021

Sports

 Julia Marino (Nu): Paraguay's first Winter Olympian

Career Opportunities 
There are many headquarters staff opportunities at Alpha Chi Omega. In hiring, Alpha Chi Omega looks for bright and enthusiastic candidates with the goal of shaping generations of real, strong women. The work environment is fun and fast paced, embodying the values of Alpha Chi Omega. Positions allow for cross country traveling and interaction with members through both online and in person platforms. 

Current open positions include Human Resources Manager, Housing Operations Coordinator, and Chapter Consultants.  Chapter Consultants are given to recent Alpha Chi Omega graduates or members graduating during the academic year in which they applied.

See also 
List of social fraternities and sororities

References 

Student societies in the United States
National Panhellenic Conference
Fraternities and sororities based in Indianapolis
DePauw University
Student organizations established in 1885
1885 establishments in Indiana